"Third Stone from the Sun" (or "3rd Stone from the Sun") is a mostly instrumental composition by American musician Jimi Hendrix.  It incorporates several musical approaches, including jazz and psychedelic rock, with brief spoken passages.  The title reflects Hendrix's interest in science fiction and is a reference to Earth in its position as the third planet away from the sun in the solar system.

Hendrix developed elements of the piece prior to forming his group, the Jimi Hendrix Experience.  The Experience recorded versions as early as December 1966, and, in 1967, it was included on their debut album Are You Experienced. Several artists have recorded renditions and others have adapted the guitar melody line for other songs.

Background
In the summer of 1966, Hendrix relocated to New York City's Greenwich Village.  There he  explored a rock sound outside of the musical confines of the Harlem rhythm and blues scene.  While performing with his group Jimmy James and the Blue Flames at the Cafe Wha?, Hendrix played elements or early versions of "Third Stone from the Sun".  He continued to develop it after moving to England with new manager Chas Chandler.  The two shared an interest in science fiction writing, including that of American author Philip Jose Farmer.  Chandler recalled:

Music journalist Charles Shaar Murray associates it with the "hazy cosmic jive straight out of the Sun Ra science fiction textbook."  Hendrix chronicler Harry Shapiro suggests that his reference of a hen may have been inspired by "Ain't Nobody Here but Us Chickens", a jump blues song by Louis Jordan. Jordan's song was one of the biggest hits of 1946 and was popular with rhythm and blues bands in Seattle, where Hendrix grew up and first performed.

Composition
Hendrix biographer Keith Shadwick describes "Third Stone from the Sun" as "a structured group performance" composed of several identifiable passages or sections with further subdivisions.The first section opens with guitar chording, which Murray notes as "sliding major ninth ... arpeggiated chords and Coltranoid mock-orientalisms" with Mitch Mitchell's Elvin Jones-influenced drumming.  After several bars of the intro, Hendrix moves to a Wes Montgomery-style octave guitar melody line.  It is one of Hendrix's most recognizable guitar figures and is notated in common or 4/4 time in the key of E:

Several writers have noted the jazz influences in the first section.  However, Shadwick points out that "at no point does the band sound merely like a group of musicians imitating other styles.  They have their own musical identity."  Midway, Hendrix adds a bluesy guitar improvisation part with Mitchell and Redding switching to a more standard rock rhythm backing, before returning to the guitar melody.

Around 2:30, Hendrix abruptly changes direction with a vibrato arm swoop, which sets the stage for the second section and his feedback-laden guitar improvisations.  Music critic Richie Unterberger described it as an "instrumental freak-out jam" and "a tour de force of psychedelic guitar".  Redding anchors the section with a three-note bass ostinato while Mitchell provides rhythmic improvisation.  Shadwick describes Hendrix's solo:

Murray notes that he performs largely independent of rhythm, tonality, or notes and enters into pure sound, which he describes as:  

To wind down, Hendrix returns to the guitar melody line, although with more distortion and vibrato.  The instrumental concludes with "what was possibly the Experience's version of Armageddon" and a fade.

Spoken sections

Spoken sections, often slowed down and otherwise sonically manipulated, run intermittently throughout the piece. Hendrix and Chandler recorded the dialogue, which parodies a science fiction scenario. Shadwick notes the joking nature, although Hendrix described it matter-of-factly:
  The dialogue opens with a mock communication between alien space explorers slowed to half-speed, which makes it mostly unintelligible.

The alien visitor, voiced by Hendrix at normal speed, makes some observations of the planet. He marvels at the "majestic and superior cackling hen", but dismisses the people and concludes: 

Music journalist Peter Doggett notes the irony of the surf music reference. In 1970, business manager Michael Jeffery committed Hendrix to contributing to the soundtrack for Rainbow Bridge; his music is heard during surfing scenes with David Nuuhiwa and others. Pioneer surf guitarist Dick Dale, who claimed to have met Hendrix in Los Angeles in 1964, believed the mention was Hendrix's way of encouraging his recuperation when Dale was seriously ill.

Recording

"Third Stone from the Sun" was one of the earliest recordings attempted by the Experience.  They recorded a demo version at CBS studios in London on December 13, 1966.  However, because of a dispute over studio fees, it was left unfinished.  On January 11, 1967, several takes were recorded at De Lane Lea Studios in London, but a master was not realized.  Work on the track resumed on April 4, 1967, at Olympic Studios in London.  Session engineer Eddie Kramer recalls that the original recording was largely abandoned and replaced with new overdubs.

The master for the track was finally completed on April 10, 1967, also at Olympic.  At this session, the spoken sections and sound effects were recorded and the final audio mixing took place.  Several takes were required since Hendrix and Chandler were joking and laughing throughout the session.  Hendrix biographer and later producer John McDermott notes that it shows the camaraderie enjoyed by the two during the early days of the Experience.

The instrumental makes novel use of recording and mixing.  Hendrix contributed to the sound effects by moving his headphones around the microphone to alter the sound of his whispers and breathing. In preparing the final mix, Kramer experimented with the track's sound imaging or an instrument's apparent placement, but was limited by the existing technology.  He later explained:

Releases and performances

"Third Stone from the Sun" was released on the Experience's debut album, Are You Experienced.  It appears as the third track on side two of the LP record.  Track Records issued the album in the UK on May 12, 1967, using "3rd Stone from the Sun" as the title.  It also used a monaural mix, which includes an extra line, "War must be war".  Reprise Records issued the album in the US on August 23, 1967, with a stereo mix.

In 1982, the instrumental was included on the  UK Voodoo Chile 12-inch single and the following The Singles Album (1983).  It also appeared on compilations, such as Re-Experienced (1975), The Essential Jimi Hendrix (1978), 
Kiss the Sky (1984), and Voodoo Child: The Jimi Hendrix Collection (2001 UK bonus track). In 2000, a version with some different overdubbed dialogue (and without sound processing) was released on The Jimi Hendrix Experience boxed set.

Mitchell recalled that the instrumental was only played live occasionally.  A performance at Blaise's club in London shortly after the December 1966 release of "Hey Joe" was reviewed by music journalist Chris Welch for Melody Maker.  It was the only original piece among several songs he mentioned in the article.  Hendrix played some of the guitar melody line during "Spanish Castle Magic" at the Maple Leaf Gardens in Toronto, Canada, shortly after his arrest for drug possession on May 3, 1969.  Hendrix biographer Steven Roby identifies a 1969 concert recording, possibly from Germany in January, as the only recorded complete performance of "Third Stone from the Sun".  None of the live recordings have been officially released.

Reception and influence
Music writers have described the instrumental's jazz elements and Murray questions whether Hendrix's approach was studied or more organic.  Bassist Jaco Pastorius felt that Hendrix's impact on jazz was obvious: "All I got to say is ... 'Third Stone from the Sun'.  And for anyone who doesn't know about that by now [1982], they should have checked Jimi out a lot earlier."

According to music educator William Echard, "Third Stone from the Sun" "closely resemble[s] later space-rock norms and was likely influential in putting these into place". Shadwick feels that the freak-out sections may have inspired countless less-imaginative imitators.  In a song review for AllMusic, Unterberger saw the potential for a more fully realized piece:

Musicians from a variety of backgrounds have recorded versions of the instrumental. A live recording by guitarist Stevie Ray Vaughan appears on Live at the El Mocambo (1991 video). Music critic Bret Adams wrote in an album review for AllMusic, "Vaughan pays tribute to Hendrix again with 'Third Stone from the Sun'; he thrashes on his famously mangled sunburst Stratocaster and coaxes unholy noises out of it. It's as if Pete Townshend took possession of him in that moment." The more complete version is included on Power of Soul: A Tribute to Jimi Hendrix (2004). AllMusic's Sean Westergaard calls it "a blistering live medley of 'Little Wing' and 'Third Stone from the Sun'... Vaughan absolutely nails it. There are some flubs in his performance, but the amount of feeling he plays with easily overcomes them".

The guitar melody has been quoted in a number of different recorded songs, such as "Baby, Please Don't Go" (the Amboy Dukes, 1968), "Dance with the Devil" (Cozy Powell, 1973), and "I'm Too Sexy" (Right Said Fred, 1991),

Notes
Footnotes

Citations

References

External links
 Stevie Ray Vaughan"Third Stone from the Sun" (from Live at the El Mocambo, 1991) on Vevo

1967 songs
Songs about outer space
Song recordings produced by Chas Chandler
Songs written by Jimi Hendrix
The Jimi Hendrix Experience songs
1960s instrumentals